Napoleoni is an Italian surname. Notable people with the surname include:

Loretta Napoleoni (born 1955), Italian journalist and political analyst
Luigi Napoleoni (born 1937), Italian boxer
Stefano Napoleoni (born 1986), Italian footballer

Italian-language surnames